USS Noa may refer to the following ships of the United States Navy:

 , a destroyer, commissioned in 1921, converted to a transport and sunk in an accident in 1944.
 , commissioned in 1946, stricken in 1975 and transferred to Spain.

United States Navy ship names